Syncopacma cincticulella is a moth of the family Gelechiidae. It was described by Charles Théophile Bruand d'Uzelle in 1851. It is found in Asia Minor and southern and south-eastern Europe, where it has been recorded from Spain, France, Germany, Austria, Switzerland, Italy, the Czech Republic, Slovakia, Hungary, Romania, Poland, Ukraine and Russia.

The wingspan is 9–12 mm.

The larvae feed on Astragalus glycyphyllos, Coronilla varia, Cytisus scoparius, Dorycnium species, Genista germanica, Genista tinctoria and Ornithopus species.

References

Moths described in 1851
Syncopacma